Trochomorpha melvillensis is a species of land snail in the family Trochomorphidae. It is endemic to Australia, where it is known only from Melville Island off the coast of the Northern Territory.

This snail is about 1 to 1.2 centimeters wide. It has a sharp keel along the curve of its shell and a red band along the coil. It lives under logs in coastal rainforest habitat. It has been found at only a few locations.

References

Gastropods of Australia
Trochomorphidae
Tiwi Islands
Gastropods described in 1989
Taxonomy articles created by Polbot